The Quincy family  was a prominent political family in Massachusetts from the mid-17th century through to the early 20th century. It is connected to the Adams political family through Abigail Adams.

The family estate was in Mount Wollaston, first independent, then part of Braintree, Massachusetts, and now the city of Quincy. The remaining pieces of the Quincy homestead are the Josiah Quincy House and the Dorothy Quincy Homestead, after the land was broken up into building lots called Wollaston Park in the 19th century and the Josiah Quincy Mansion was demolished in 1969.

The names of President John Quincy Adams, several American towns, Quincy House at Harvard, Quincy House in Washington, D.C., and Quincy Market in Boston are among the legacies of the Quincy family name.

Members

Edmund Quincy (1602–1636) I, who emigrated to Boston 1633 and settled Mount Wollaston 1635, married Judith Pares (d. 1654)
Judith Quincy (1626–1695), married John Hull (1624–1683), merchant and Massachusetts Bay Colony politician
Edmund Quincy (1628–1698) II, who built the Dorothy Quincy House (1685), married Joanna Hoar (1625–1680) and remarried to Elizabeth Gookin Eliot (1645–1700)
Daniel Quincy (1651–1690), Boston merchant and ker, married Anna Shephard (1663–1708)
Anna Quincy (1685–1717), married John Holman (1679–1759)
Colonel John Quincy (1689–1767): Quincy, Massachusetts and John Quincy Adams were both named in his honor. Quincy was Abigail Adams' grandfather. He was John Quincy Adams' great-grandfather. John married Elizabeth Norton (1696–1769) of Hingham, daughter of Rev. John Norton, pastor of Old Ship Church.
Norton Quincy (1716–1801), public servant, recluse, married Martha Salisbury (1727–1748)
Anna Quincy (1719–1799), married John Thaxter (1721–1802) of Hingham
Elizabeth Quincy (1721–1775), married the Reverend William Smith (1707–1783) of the First Church of Weymouth
Mary Smith (1741–1811), married Richard Cranch (1726–1811)
Abigail Smith (1744–1818), married John Adams (1735–1826), second president of the United States
Abigail Adams (1765–1813), "Nabby" married William Stephens Smith (1755–1816)
John Quincy Adams (1767–1848), sixth president of the United States, married Louisa Catherine Johnson (1775–1852)
Charles Francis Adams, Sr. (1807–1886), married Abigail Brooks (1808–1889)
John Quincy Adams II (1833–1894), lawyer and politician
Charles Francis Adams, Jr. (1835–1915), Civil War general, president of Union Pacific Railroad (1884–1890)
Charles Francis Adams III (1866–1954), 44th Secretary of the Navy, mayor of Quincy, Massachusetts
Henry Brooks Adams (1838–1918), married Marian Hooper (1843–1885)
Mary Gardiner Adams (1845–1928), married Henry Parker Quincy (1838–1899)
Susanna Boylston Adams (1768–1770)
Charles Adams (1770–1800), married Sarah Smith
Thomas Boylston Adams (1772–1832), Massachusetts Representative, justice, married Ann Harrod
William Smith (1746–1787), married Catherine Louise Salmon (1749–1824)
Elizabeth Smith (1750–1815), married John Shaw (1748–1794), remarried to Stephen Peabody (1741–1819)
Lucy Quincy (1729–1785), married Cotton Tufts (1732–1815)
John Quincy (1652–1674)
Joanna Quincy (1654–1695), married Lieut. David Hobart (1651–1717) of Hingham
Judith Quincy (1655–1679), married John Rayner (1643–1676)
Ruth Quincy (1658–1698), married John Hunt
Edmund Quincy (1681–1737) III, married Dorothy Flynt (1678–1737)
Edmund Quincy (1703–1788) IV, married Elizabeth Wendell (1704–1769) partner with brother Josiah Quincy (1710–1784)
Edmund Quincy (1726–1782) V, businessman and land developer, married Anna Huske, remarried to Mehitabel Temple, remarried to Hannah Gannett
Henry Quincy (1727–1780), married Mary Salter, remarried to Eunice Newell
Abraham Quincy (1728–1756)
Elizabeth Quincy (1729–1770), married Samuel Sewall (1715–1771)
Katherine Quincy (b. 1733)
Dr. Jacob Quincy (1734–1773), married Elizabeth Williams
Sarah Quincy (1736–1790), married General William Greenleaf
Esther Quincy (1738–1810), married Jonathan Sewall (1728–1796), last royal attorney general of Massachusetts
Dorothy Quincy (1747–1830), married John Hancock (1737–1793), remarried to Captain James Scott (1746–1809)
Elizabeth Quincy (1706–1746), married John Wendell (1703–1762)
Dorothy Quincy (1709–1762), "Dorothy Q" of Oliver Wendell Holmes, Jr., married Edward Jackson (1707–1757), Boston merchant and manufacturer
Mary Jackson (1740–1804), married Oliver Wendell (1733–1818)
Sarah Wendell married the Reverend Abiel Holmes (1763–1837)
Oliver Wendell Holmes, Sr. (1809–1894), married Amelia Lee Jackson
Oliver Wendell Holmes, Jr. (1841–1935), jurist
Jonathan Jackson (1743–1810), merchant and Continental Congress delegate from Massachusetts, married Sarah Barnard (d. 1770), remarried to Hannah Tracy (d. 1797)
Edward Jackson (1768–1777)
Henry Jackson (1774–1806), married Hannah Swett (1774–1850)
Charles Jackson (1775–1855), married Amelia Lee(d. 1808), remarried to Frances Cabot
Amelia Lee Jackson (d. 1888), married Oliver Wendell Holmes, Sr. (1809–1894)
Hannah Jackson, married Francis Cabot Lowell (1775–1817)
Sarah Jackson, married John Gardner (1770–1825)
Dr. James Jackson (1777–1867), married Elizabeth Cabot, remarried to Sarah Cabot
Patrick Tracy Jackson (1780–1847), married Lydia Cabot
Colonel Josiah Quincy I (1710–1784), Revolutionary War soldier, built the Josiah Quincy House, married Hanna Sturgis (1712–1755), remarried to Elizabeth Waldron (1722–1760), remarried to Ann Marsh (1723–1805)
Edmund Quincy (1733–1768), Boston merchant died at sea in West Indies
Samuel Quincy (1735–1789), attorney and barrister, solicitor general, loyalist exile, married Hannah Hill (1734–1782) who was a revolutionary and stayed in Massachusetts during her husband's exile, remarried to Mary Ann Chadwell
Hannah Quincy (1736–1826), "Orlinda" of John Adams diaries, married Bela Lincoln (1734–1773), Hingham physician, brother of General Benjamin Lincoln; remarried to Ebenezer Storer (1730–1807), deacon of Brattle Street Church and treasurer of Harvard College
Josiah Quincy II (1744–1775), attorney, "the Patriot", newspaper propagandist, died at sea returning from mission to London, married Abigail Phillips (1745–1798), daughter of William Phillips, Sr. (1722–1804)
Josiah Quincy III (1772–1864), president of Harvard University (1829–1845), U.S. Representative (1805–1813), mayor of Boston (1823–1828), married Eliza Susan Morton (1773–1850)
Eliza Susan Quincy (1798–1884), eldest of "five articulate sisters", artist, archivist and historian
Josiah Quincy, Jr. (1802–1882), mayor of Boston (1846–1848), built the Josiah Quincy Mansion, married Mary Jane Miller (1806–1874)
Josiah Phillips Quincy (1829–1910), poet, writer, publicist, married Helen Frances Huntington (1831–1903)
Josiah Quincy (1859–1919), General Court representative, assistant secretary of the Navy, mayor of Boston (1895–1899), married Ellen Krebs Tyler (1862–1904)
Edmund Quincy (b. 1903), artist
Helen Quincy (b. 1861)
Frances Huntington Quincy (1870–1933), essayist and author, married Mark Antony DeWolfe Howe (1864–1960)
Quincy Howe (b. 1900), news analyst, author
Helen Huntington Howe (b. 1905), monologuist, novelist, married Reginald Allen
Mark DeWolfe Howe (1906–1967), Harvard law professor, historian, biographer, civil rights leader
Mabel Quincy
Violet Quincy
Samuel Miller Quincy (1833–1887), lawyer, historian, Civil War soldier, and 28th mayor of New Orleans (May 5, 1865 – June 8, 1865)
Mary Apthorp Quincy (1834–1883), married Benjamin Apthorp Gould
Susan Quincy Gould (b. 1862)
Lucretia Gould (b. 1864)
Alice Bache Gould (b. 1868)
Benjamin Apthorp Gould (b. 1870)
Maria Gould (b. 1872)
Abigail Phillips Quincy (1803–1893), last Quincy to occupy the Josiah Quincy House
Maria Sophia Quincy (1805–1886)
Margaret Morton Quincy (1806–1882), married Benjamin Daniel Greene (1793–1862), traveler and botanist
Edmund Quincy (1808–1877), diarist, lecturer, author, abolitionist, married Lucilla Pinckney Parker (1810–1860), daughter of prominent Boston merchant Daniel Pinckney Parker
Edmund Quincy (1834–1894), civil engineer
Henry Parker Quincy (1838–1899), Harvard MD, "anatomical draughtsman", married Mary Gardiner Adams (1845–1928)
Mary Quincy (b. 1841)
Anna Cabot Lowell Quincy (1812–1899), youngest of the "articulate sisters", married Robert Cassie Waterston (1812–1899), Boston clergyman who gave his library to the Massachusetts Historical Society
Elizabeth Quincy (1757–1825), married Benjamin Guild (1749–1792)
Ann Quincy (1763–1844), married Asa Packard (1758–1843)
John Quincy (b.1683)
Mary Quincy (1684–1716), married Daniel Baker (1686–1731)

Notes and references

 
Political families of the United States
 
American families of English ancestry